The Paturis Park murders are a series of 13 murders of gay men committed between February 2007 and August 2008. The murders took place in Paturis Park ("Parque dos Paturis") in Carapicuíba, Brazil, and were perpetrated by an unidentified serial killer who has been dubbed the "Rainbow Maniac".

Murders and investigation
The killings took place between February 2007 and August 2008 in Paturis Park. The victims, all gay men, were aged 20–40. All but one were shot, 12 of them in the head; one died from blows to the head. The last victim was shot 12 times. According to Brazilian media, the park is in an area frequented by prostitutes. Police dubbed the killer the "Rainbow Maniac", a reference to the gay pride flag.

The first murder occurred on 4 July 2007 and the last on 15 March 2009.

Officials from the São Paulo State Public Safety Department announced that the killer could be a state police officer. , tests are underway to see if the same gun was used in each murder.

Suspect arrested 
On 10 December 2008, police arrested a retired state police sergeant, Jairo Francisco Franco, based on witness statements implicating him in a murder which occurred on 19 August 2008. A witness claims to have seen Franco shoot a black gay man 12 times that night. Another witness told police that Franco often visited the park to look for gay men and victims.

Suspect released 
On 23 August 2011, Jairo Francisco Franco was released after the trial, having been declared not guilty by the jury by 4 votes against 2.

See also
List of fugitives from justice who disappeared
List of unsolved murders

References

2007 in LGBT history
2007 murders in Brazil
2008 in LGBT history
2008 murders in Brazil
Deaths by firearm in Brazil
Fugitives
Hate crimes
LGBT in Brazil
Male murder victims
Murder in Brazil
Serial murders in Brazil
Unidentified serial killers
Unsolved murders in Brazil
Violence against gay men